Slavko Dacevski (born 9 July 1930) was a Macedonian football player and manager.

Club career
Born in Skopje, Vardarska Banovina, he started playing in the youth team of FK Vardar having become Yugoslav youth champion in 1949.  He debuted for the senior team of Vardar in the season 1950. In 1955 he joined Red Star Belgrade, but failed to debut in the league, played just one game in the Yugoslav Cup, so he moved to FK Budućnost Titograd where he played between 1957 and 1960.  Then he returned to Vardar and played until 1965, having won with them the 1960–61 Yugoslav Cup having played in the final as a captain.

That year he moved to Australia and joined SSC Yugal in the 1965 season.  He will later coach them in 1972 and 1974, and also coached Preston Lions FC in 1975.

International career
He played 4 matches for the Yugoslav B national team, all of them in 1958.

References

External links
 

1930 births
Possibly living people
Footballers from Skopje
Association football defenders
Macedonian footballers
Yugoslav footballers
FK Vardar players
Red Star Belgrade footballers
FK Budućnost Podgorica players
Yugoslav First League players
SSC Yugal players
Yugoslav expatriate footballers
Expatriate soccer players in Australia
Yugoslav expatriate sportspeople in Australia
Yugoslav football managers
Macedonian football managers
Preston Lions FC managers
Yugoslav expatriate football managers
Expatriate soccer managers in Australia